Udaygiri caves may refer to:

 Udayagiri Caves in Madhya Pradesh, India
 Udayagiri and Khandagiri Caves in Odisha, India

See also
Udayagiri (disambiguation)